Señorita is a five-song EP from Superdrag released by Darla Records in 1999. All five songs can be found on their previous album, Stereo "360 Sound".

Track listing
"Señorita" - 3:17
"Cuts and Scars" - 2:07
"H.H.T." - 4:04
"My Prayer" - 2:23
"Nothing Good Is Real" - 3:44

Personnel
John Davis: Vocals, Guitars
Brandon Fisher: Guitars
Tom Pappas: Bass
Don Coffey Jr.: Drums

External links
Superdrag's official web site

Superdrag albums
1999 EPs
Albums produced by Nick Raskulinecz